Corcoran Stadium was a stadium in Cincinnati, Ohio.  It hosted the Xavier University Musketeers football team until the school dropped football for financial reasons in 1973.  The stadium held 15,000 people when it opened on November 23, 1929. The grandstands were finally razed in 1988 after attempts to revive the program in the NCAA's Division III failed. The facility is now known as Corcoran Field. It is used for soccer and lacrosse, and has seating for 1,500. 

Corcoran Stadium also played host to one NFL game on October 7, 1934 when the Cincinnati Reds (NFL) took on the Chicago Cardinals. The Reds lost the match by a score of 13-0 before 2,500 Reds fans.

Corcoran Stadium can be seen in the 1946 movie The Best Years of Our Lives as "Jackson High Football Stadium". A few seconds later Walnut Hills High School with its distinctive dome and football field can be seen along with the downtown Cincinnati skyline (Carew Tower and PNC Tower) in the background.

References

External links
 Article on Xavier football program

Defunct college football venues
Defunct National Football League venues
Xavier Musketeers football
Sports venues in Cincinnati
American football venues in Ohio
Demolished sports venues in Ohio
1929 establishments in Ohio
Sports venues completed in 1929
1988 disestablishments in Ohio
Sports venues demolished in 1988